Distelsee is a high alpine lake in the canton of Valais, Switzerland. It is located at an elevation of 2587 m, below Brudelhorn. Its surface area is 4.8 ha.

See also
List of mountain lakes of Switzerland

Lakes of Valais